During the 1987–88 English football season, Brentford competed in the Football League Third Division. The Bees contended for a place in the play-offs until a run of just two wins from the final 17 matches of the season dropped the club into mid-table.

Season summary 
After taking over as Brentford manager in January 1987, Steve Perryman continued the remodelling of his squad through the 1987 off-season. Transferred out were defender Phil Bater, midfielder Paul Maddy and forward Francis Joseph, with the deals raising £37,000. In came a number of players on free transfers or a trial basis, the most notable of whom being former Chelsea midfielder Colin Lee, in a dual player/Youth Development Officer role. After beginning the Third Division season in and around the relegation places, manager Perryman continued to buy and sell players, raising another £10,000 from the sale of defender Jamie Murray and winger Ian Holloway and bringing in former Chelsea midfielder Keith Jones for a £40,000 fee. With forward Gary Blissett failing to show form in front of goal and Andy Sinton almost single-handedly leading the attack from midfield, the loan signing of Paul Williams in October 1987 galvanised the team, with Williams scoring six goals in eight appearances before being recalled by Charlton Athletic. An eight-match unbeaten run from mid-November 1987 to 2 January 1988, despite the £30,000 sale of forward Robbie Cooke, put Brentford as high as 6th position, once place outside the play-off zone. The December loan signing of Arsenal midfielder Graham Rix proved key to the continued good form.

A 1–0 win over Blackpool at Bloomfield Road on 16 January 1988, courtesy of a Keith Millen goal, raised Brentford into the play-off zone. After 3–1 victory over rivals Fulham in the following league match and the recall of Graham Rix to Highbury, the Bees' form disintegrated. The team lost four consecutive matches in February without scoring a goal and would win just two of the final 17 matches of the season to finish in 12th place. Manager Steve Perryman had attempted to rectify the slump by signing midfielder Ian Stewart and forward Les Ferdinand on loan, but both proved to be a disappointment. Right back Roger Joseph's performances earned him a place in the Third Division PFA Team of the Year, the first time a Brentford player had been recognised by the PFA.

League table

Results
Brentford's goal tally listed first.

Legend

Pre-season and friendlies

Football League Third Division

FA Cup

Football League Cup

Football League Trophy 

 Sources: 100 Years of Brentford, The Big Brentford Book of the Eighties,Croxford, Lane & Waterman, p. 404-406. Statto

Playing squad 
Players' ages are as of the opening day of the 1987–88 season.

 Sources: The Big Brentford Book of the Eighties, Timeless Bees

Coaching staff

Statistics

Appearances and goals
Substitute appearances in brackets.

Players listed in italics left the club mid-season.
Source: The Big Brentford Book of the Eighties

Goalscorers 

Players listed in italics left the club mid-season.
Source: The Big Brentford Book of the Eighties

Management

Summary

Transfers & loans

Awards 
 Supporters' Player of the Year: Andy Sinton
 Players' Player of the Year: Roger Joseph
 Third Division PFA Team of the Year: Roger Joseph

References 

Brentford F.C. seasons
Brentford